Greenland is an autonomous constituent country of the Kingdom of Denmark between the Arctic and Atlantic Oceans, east of the Canadian Arctic Archipelago. Though physiographically a part of the continent of North America, Greenland has been politically and culturally associated with Europe (specifically Norway and Denmark, the colonial powers, as well as the nearby island of Iceland) for more than a millennium.

In 1979, Denmark had granted home rule to Greenland, and in 2008, Greenlanders voted in favour of the Self-Government Act, which transferred more power from the Kingdom Government (Regeringen) to the local Self-rule Government (Naalakkersuisut). Under the new structure, in effect since 21 June 2009, Greenland can gradually assume responsibility for policing, judicial system, company law, accounting, and auditing; mineral resource activities; aviation; law of legal capacity, family law and succession law; aliens and border controls; the working environment; and financial regulation and supervision, while the Kingdom Government retains control of foreign affairs and defence. It also retains control of monetary policy, providing an initial annual subsidy of DKK 3.4 billion, which is planned to diminish gradually over time. Greenland expects to grow its economy based on increased income from the extraction of natural resources. The capital, Nuuk, held the 2016 Arctic Winter Games. Greenland leads the world in renewable energy. 70% of its energy is from renewable sources, particularly hydropower.

Notable firms 
This list includes notable companies with primary headquarters located in the country. The industry and sector follow the Industry Classification Benchmark taxonomy. Organizations which have ceased operations are included and noted as defunct.

See also 

 List of hotels in Greenland
 List of banks in Greenland

References 

Companies of Greenland by industry
+Greenland
Greenland
 Companies
Greenland